Robert de Losinga may refer to
Another name for Robert the Lotharingian
Robert de Losinga, Abbot of New Minster, Winchester, and father of Herbert de Losinga, Bishop of Norwich